Silibinin (INN), also known as silybin (both from Silybum, the generic name of the plant from which it is extracted), is the major active constituent of silymarin, a standardized extract of the milk thistle seeds, containing a mixture of flavonolignans consisting of silibinin, isosilibinin, silychristin, silidianin, and others.  Silibinin itself is a mixture of two diastereomers, silybin A and silybin B, in approximately equimolar ratio.  The mixture exhibits a number of pharmacological effects, particularly in the fatty liver, non-alcoholic fatty liver, non-alcoholic steatohepatitis, and there is great clinical evidence for the use of silibinin as a supportive element in alcoholic and Child–Pugh grade 'A' liver cirrhosis. However, despite its several beneficial effects on the liver, silibinin and all the other compounds found in silymarin, especially silychristin seem to act as potent disruptors of the thyroid system by blocking the MCT8 transporter. The long term intake of silymarin can lead to some form of thyroid disease and if taken during pregnancy, silymarin can cause the development of the Allan–Herndon–Dudley syndrome. Although this information is not being taken into consideration by all regulatory bodies, several studies now consider silymarin and especially silychristin to be important inhibitors of the MCT8 transporter and a potential disruptor of the thyroid hormone functions.

Pharmacology
Poor water solubility and bioavailability of silymarin led to the development of enhanced formulations. Silipide (trade name Siliphos, not to be confused with the water treatment compound of the same name, a glass-like polyphosphate containing sodium, calcium magnesium and silicate, formulated for the treatment of water problems), a complex of silymarin and phosphatidylcholine (lecithin), is about 10 times more bioavailable than silymarin. An earlier study had concluded Siliphos to have 4.6 fold higher bioavailability.  It has been also reported that silymarin inclusion complex with β-cyclodextrin is much more soluble than silymarin itself. There have also been prepared glycosides of silybin, which show better water solubility and even stronger hepatoprotective effect.

Silymarin, like other flavonoids, has been shown to inhibit P-glycoprotein-mediated cellular efflux. The modulation of P-glycoprotein activity may result in altered absorption and bioavailability of drugs that are P-glycoprotein substrates. It has been reported that silymarin inhibits cytochrome P450 enzymes and an interaction with drugs primarily cleared by P450s cannot be excluded.

Toxicity 
Several studies have documented the potentially dangerous effects of the silymarin mixture on the thyroid system. All of the flavonolignan compounds found in the silymarin mixture seem to block the uptake of thyroid hormones into the cells by selectively blocking the MCT8 transmembrane transporter. The authors of this study noted that especially silychristin, one of the compounds of the silymarin mixture seems to be perhaps the most powerful and selective inhibitor for the MCT8 transporter. Due to the essential role played by the thyroid hormone in human metabolism in general it is believed that the intake of silymarin can lead to disruptions of the thyroid system. Because the thyroid hormones and the MCT8 as well are known to play a critical role during early and fetal development, the administration of silymarin during pregnancy is especially thought to be dangerous, potentially leading to the Allan–Herndon–Dudley syndrome, a brain development disorder that causes both moderate to severe intellectual disability and problems with speech and movement.

A phase I clinical trial in humans with prostate cancer designed to study the effects of high dose silibinin found 13 grams daily to be well tolerated in patients with advanced prostate cancer with asymptomatic liver toxicity (hyperbilirubinemia and elevation of alanine aminotransferase) being the most commonly seen adverse event.

Silymarin is also devoid of embryotoxic potential in animal models.

Medical uses 

Silibinin is available as drug (Legalon SIL (Madaus) (D, CH, A) and Silimarit (Bionorica), a Silymarin product) in many EU countries and used in the treatment of toxic liver damage (e.g. IV treatment in case of death cap poisoning); as adjunctive therapy in chronic hepatitis and cirrhosis.

For approved drug preparations and parenteral applications in the treatment of Amanita mushroom poisoning, the water-soluble silibinin-C-2',3-dihyrogensuccinate disodium salt is used. In 2011,  the same compound also received Orphan Medicinal Product Designation for the prevention of recurrent hepatitis C in liver transplant recipients by the European Commission.

Potential medical uses 
Silibinin is under investigation to see whether it may have a role in cancer treatment (e.g. due to its inhibition of STAT3 signalling).

Silibinin also has a number of potential mechanisms that could benefit the skin. These include chemoprotective effects from environmental toxins, anti-inflammatory effects, protection from UV induced photocarcinogenesis, protection from sunburn, protection from UVB-induced epidermal hyperplasia, and DNA repair for UV induced DNA damage (double strand breaks). Studies on mice demonstrate a significant protection on chronic unpredictable mild stress (CUMS) induced depressive-like behavior on mice and increased cognition in aged rats as a result of consuming silymarin.

Due to its immunomodulatory, iron chelating and antioxidant properties, this herb has the potential to be used in beta-thalassemia patients who receive regular blood transfusions and suffer from iron overload.

Biotechnology 
Silymarin can be produced in callus and cells suspensions of Silybum marianum and substituted pyrazinecarboxamides can be used as abiotic elicitors of flavolignan production.

Biosynthesis 
The biosynthesis of silibinin A and silibinin B is composed of two major parts, taxifolin and coniferyl alcohol. Coniferyl alcohol is synthesized in milk thistle seed coat. Starting with the transformation of phenylalanine into cinnamic acid mediated by phenylalanine ammonia-lyase. Cinnamic acid will then go through two rounds of oxidation by trans-cinnamate 4-monooxygenase and 4-coumarate 3-hydroxylase to give caffeic acid. The meta position alcohol is methylated by caffeic acid 3-O-methyltransferase to produce ferulic acid. From ferulic acid, the production of coniferyl alcohol is carried out by 4-hydroxycinnamate CoA ligase, cinnamoyl CoA reductase, and cinnamyl alcohol dehydrogenase. For taxifolin, its genes for the biosynthesis can be overexpressed in flowers as the transcription is light dependent. The production of taxifolin utilizes a similar pathway as for synthesizing p-coumaric acid followed by three times of carbon chain elongation with malonyl-CoA and cyclization by chalcone synthase and chalcone isomerase to yield naringenin. Through flavanone 3-hydroxylase and flavonoid 3'-monooxygenase, taxifolin is furnished. To merge taxifolin and coniferyl alcohol, taxifolin can be translocated from the flower to the seed coat through symplast pathway. Both taxifolin and coniferyl alcohol will be oxidized by ascorbate peroxidase 1 to enable the single electron reaction to couple two fragments generating silybin (silibinin A + silibinin B).

References

External links 
 Review of the Quality of Evidence for Milk Thistle Use from MayoClinic.com

 

Antidotes
Flavonolignans
Resorcinols
3-Hydroxypropenals
Benzodioxans